Karetus is a Portuguese group formed by two DJs and music producers, Carlos Silva and André Reis and one MC, Paulo Silva, who was added later.

Discography

Albums

Singles

References

External links
 

Portuguese electronic music groups
Portuguese DJs
Musical duos
Electronic dance music DJs